Machines at War is a real-time strategy video game developed by Isotope 244. It is the predecessor of Land Air Sea Warfare.

Gameplay 

The gameplay is inspired by the seminal Command & Conquer series. However, Machines at War does not feature infantry units or navy units.

Reception 
 Out of Eight PC Game Reviews called it "A straightforward RTS game with some clever ideas" and rated it 6/8.
 Software Review Boffin gave the Mac version 5 stars out of 5 and the Silver badge.
 Inside Mac Games rated the Mac version with 5/5 and praised the destructible environment. However, it was criticized that "the only option is to play a quick skirmish against up to three computer opponents".

External links 
 Machines at War on Isotope 244 (official homepage)

References 

Real-time strategy video games
2007 video games
MacOS games
Video games developed in the United States
Windows games
Windows Mobile Professional games